The Stanford 20/20 was a short-lived cricket tournament in the Caribbean island of Antigua. It was held first in July and August 2006 in the West Indies at the Stanford Cricket Ground, St. John's, Antigua and Barbuda, and then again in the same place in 2008. It was a variety of the popular Twenty20 format, which had been first introduced in English cricket in 2003. The tournament was separate to the Stanford Super Series, which was held in late 2008.

The tournament was privately devised and funded by wealthy American businessman Allen Stanford, who held Antiguan dual nationality. It has been alleged that Stanford's creation of the tournament was a method of laundering his income from the fraudulent business schemes for which he is now serving a lengthy penal sentence in the U.S.A.

19 teams took part in the inaugural knock-out tournament and 20 teams took part in the second tournament (although 21 teams were originally scheduled to take part). The 2008 season was part of the official calendar of the WICB.

2006 tournament

Qualifying matches

Bracket

2008 tournament
Initially it was planned to include two additional teams from the region in the 2008 competition, Cuba and the Turks and Caicos Islands, increasing the number of teams participating to twenty-one (21).

However, since the application required by US citizens (such as Stanford himself) and organisations to interact with the island under the United States embargo against Cuba was rejected, Sint Maarten (Cuba's destined opponent in the preliminary round) received a bye.

Preliminary matches

Cuba were barred from participating in the tournament; St Maarten received a bye to the next round

Brackets

See also
 Stanford Super Series

Notes

 
West Indian domestic cricket competitions
Twenty20 cricket leagues
Stanford Financial Group
Recurring sporting events established in 2006
Recurring sporting events disestablished in 2008
Sports leagues established in 2010
2006 establishments in Antigua and Barbuda